The Diploma Andreanum, or Der Goldener Freibrief der Siebenbürger Sachsen (English: Golden Charter of the Transylvanian Saxons), was issued by King Andrew II of Hungary in 1224, granting provisional autonomy to colonial Germans residing in the region of Transylvania of the then Kingdom of Hungary, more specifically the present-day area of Sibiu, central Romania.

References 

1224 in Europe
13th-century documents
13th-century Latin literature
Medieval Latin texts
Medieval documents
Medieval charters and cartularies of Hungary
13th century in Hungary
Medieval Transylvania
Hungarian German communities
Transylvanian Saxon people